Raymond James "Ray" McStay (born 18 May 1970) is a Scottish former footballer who played as a midfielder.

Playing career
McStay began his career at Celtic, where his older brothers Willie and Paul, as well as his great-uncles Willie and Jimmy had already played. A product of Celtic Boys Club, McStay signed professional forms at the same time as youth teammate Gerry Creaney. Despite being regularly mentioned as having a big future at the club McStay had to wait until the 1992–93 season before being called into the Celtic first team and even then he only made the bench for a single league game against St Johnstone and was not called upon to play.

McStay left Celtic in January 1995 to sign for Hamilton Academical on a free transfer. He made 30 league appearances in nearly two years at the club although he spent summer of 1996 having an unsuccessful trial with Stade Lavallois. He subsequently had a trial with Wycombe Wanderers and was poised to sign for the club in October 1996 but the move fell through for undisclosed reasons. In late 1996 he was loaned to Hereford United where he did not play a league game before, during the 1996–97 season, playing a single game for Cardiff City. McStay quit football soon after this.

In summer 1997, whilst on honeymoon in the Dominican Republic, McStay was admitted to hospital with severe stomach cramps and fever and was reported as suffering a "mystery illness" and was described as critically ill.

Post-football
McStay was the UK commercial director of Midgibyte, a Glasgow-based design consultancy business run by Paul McStay. He now works at a Glasgow digital agency called MadeBrave.

References

External links

1970 births
Living people
Footballers from Hamilton, South Lanarkshire
Scottish footballers
Association football midfielders
Celtic F.C. players
Hamilton Academical F.C. players
Hereford United F.C. players
Cardiff City F.C. players
Scottish Football League players
English Football League players
Ray